Una Mamea Park was founded 26 April 2010 in order to preserve natural, cultural and historical values of the river Una in the area of Donji Lapac, Lika-Senj County, Croatia. Park is founded - declared with the aim of protecting and preserving geomorphological, hydrological and values of the landscape, especially travertine barriers and waterfalls, which are its fundamental phenomena. The purpose of the park is a scientific, cultural, educational, recreational, and tourism activities such as visiting and sightseeing.

UNA MAMEA Park Arboretum is located in the southern part of the continental Croatia, on the border of Croatia and Bosnia and Herzegovina, in Lika-Senj County, in the municipality of Donji Lapac, and includes the headwaters of the river Una on the part of the right bank, near the waterfall Štrbački buk (for now the length of 3 km) and on the left bank in Bosnia and Herzegovina lies Una National Park. The area in the Republic of Croatia was declared on 26.04.2010 (Una Mamea Park Arboretum),and the area in Bosnia and Herzegovina was declared on 29.05.2008 (Una National Park), which confirms the excellence of the Una River, particularity of its natural phenomena, cultural and historical monuments.

Parks in Croatia
Protected areas of Lika-Senj County